The pre-Nectarian period of the lunar geologic timescale runs from 4.533 billion years ago (the time of the initial formation of the Moon) to 3.920 billion years ago, when the Nectaris Basin was formed by a large impact. It is followed by the Nectarian period.

Description
Pre-Nectarian rocks are rare in the lunar sample suite; they are mostly composed of lunar highlands material which have been heavily churned, brecciated, and thermally affected by subsequent impacts, particularly during the Heavy Bombardment Eon (HBE; a period of 0.6-1 Gy from the formation of the Moon until at least the formation of the Imbrium Basin ~3.9 Ga, or even later with the formation of Orientalis Basin) that marks the approximate beginning of the Nectarian period.  The primary pre-Nectarian lunar highland material is dominated by the rock type anorthosite, which suggests that the early stage of lunar crustal formation occurred via mineral crystallization of a global magma ocean.

This geologic period has been informally subdivided into the Cryptic Era (4.533 - 4.172 Ga ago) and Basin Groups 1-9 (4.172 - 3.92 Ga ago), but these divisions are not used on any geologic maps. Similarly the later period has also been called the Aitkenian period.

Impact basins

Relationship to Earth's geologic time scale
Since little or no geological evidence on Earth exists from the time spanned by the pre-Nectarian period of the Moon, the pre-Nectarian has been used as a guide by at least one notable scientific work to subdivide the unofficial terrestrial Hadean eon. In particular, it is sometimes found that the Hadean eon is subdivided into the Cryptic era, Basin Groups 1-9, Nectarian and Lower Imbrian, though the first two of these lunar divisions are informal and collectively make up the pre-Nectarian.

See also

References

External links
Palaeos.org: Hadean eon 

 
Hadean